Marc Rancourt (born April 28, 1984) is a Canadian professional ice hockey player who from 2010-2011 played with the Landshut Cannibals in the German 2nd Bundesliga.

Awards and honours

References

External links

1984 births
Living people
Belleville Bulls players
Canadian ice hockey left wingers
EV Landshut players
Ice hockey people from Ottawa
Canadian expatriate ice hockey players in Germany